"Stick Together" is a song recorded by Anthony Jasmin for their first and only EP, Stick Together. Released on June 17, 2014, the song was written by Engelina Andrina Larsen, Patrick Spiegelberg and Michael Pærremand, with John Shanks as producer.

Background
After winning the seventh season of the Danish version of X Factor, Anthony Jasmin announced that they would be recording an EP. On June 17, 2014, Anthony Jasmin released "Stick Together".

2014 songs
Song recordings produced by John Shanks
Sony Music singles
Songs written by Engelina